Otto Schmöle (1890–1968) was a German actor.

Selected filmography
 The Daughter of the Brigadier (1922)
 The Marquis of Bolibar (1922)
 Everybody's Woman (1924)
 The Curse (1924)
 A Waltz by Strauss (1925)
 Franz Schuberts letzte Liebe (1926)
 The Family without Morals (1927)
 Invisible Opponent (1933)
 Frasquita (1934)
 Spring Parade (1934)
 Linen from Ireland (1939)
 Whom the Gods Love (1942)
 Der Prozeß (1948)
 Mysterious Shadows (1949)
  Duel with Death (1949)
 Der letzte Akt (1955)
 Wilhelm Tell (1956)
 He Can't Stop Doing It (1962)

Bibliography
 Kulik, Karol. Alexander Korda: The Man Who Could Work Miracles. Virgin Books, 1990.

External links

1890 births
1968 deaths
German male film actors
Actors from Frankfurt
German male silent film actors
20th-century German male actors